Harald Normak (20 December 1890 Kohtla Parish, Virumaa – 14 December 1957 Uppsala, Sweden) was an Estonian politician. He was a member of Estonian Constituent Assembly. He was a member of the assembly since 17 December 1919. He replaced Jaan Lõo. On 23 January 1920, he resigned his position and he was replaced by Eduard Kübarsepp.

References

1890 births
1957 deaths
Members of the Estonian Constituent Assembly